Graeme Gellie (born 27 December 1954) is a former Australian rules footballer. Played for St Kilda as a rover. Height: , weight: .

Won the club's best and fairest award in his first year, but an injury to his knee early in 1979 limited his career.

After Tony Jewell was sacked as coach during the 1984 season, Gellie took over and also coached the next two years. After St Kilda claimed the wooden spoon in 1986 his contract was not continued. Greame was an assistant coach to Malcolm Blight at Geelong. Also coach in coached in Queensland state junior teams. Greame currently lives in country Victoria.

External links
 Bio at Saints.com.au
 
 

St Kilda Football Club coaches
Trevor Barker Award winners
St Kilda Football Club players
1954 births
Living people
Australian rules footballers from Victoria (Australia)
Redan Football Club players